The Hanseatic League was a medieval commercial and defensive confederation of merchant guilds and market towns in Central and Northern Europe. Growing from a few North German towns in the late 12th century, the League between the 13th and 15th centuries ultimately encompassed nearly 200 settlements, across seven modern-day countries ranging from Estonia in the north and east to the Netherlands in the west and Kraków, Poland, in the south.

The League originated from various loose associations of German traders and towns formed to advance mutual commercial interests, such as protection against robbers. These arrangements gradually coalesced into the Hanseatic League, whose traders enjoyed toll privileges and protection in affiliated communities and their trade routes. Economic interdependence and kinship ties between merchant families, who held important positions in towns, led to deeper political integration and removing obstacles to trade. Hanseatic Cities gradually developed common trade regulations.

During its heydays, the Hanseatic League dominated maritime trade in the North and Baltic seas. It established trading posts in numerous towns and cities across Europe; some of these, like the Kontors in London, Bruges, Bergen and Novgorod, became extraterritorial entities that enjoyed considerable legal autonomy. Hanseatic merchants, or Hansards, operated in basic private companies and were widely renowned for their access to a variety of commodities, subsequently gaining privileges and protections abroad. The collective economic power made the League capable of imposing blockades and even waging war against kingdoms and principalities.

Even at its zenith, the Hanseatic League was never more than a loosely aligned confederation of city-states. It lacked a permanent administrative body, treasury, and standing military force. By the mid-16th century, these weak connections left the Hanseatic League vulnerable and it gradually unraveled as members became consolidated into other realms or departed, ultimately disintegrating in 1669.

The Hanseatic League used a couple types of ships that sailed over seas and on rivers. The most emblematic type was the cog. Knowing great diversity in construction, it was depicted on Hanseatic seals and coats of arms. By the end of the Middle Ages, the cog was replaced by other types like the hulk that later gave way to larger carvel types.

Etymology 
 is the Old High German word for a band or troop. This word was applied to bands of merchants traveling between the Hanseatic cities — whether by land or by sea.  in Middle Low German came to mean a society of merchants or a trader guild. That it originally meant An-See, or "on the sea", is incorrect.

History 
Exploratory trading adventures, raids, and piracy occurred early throughout the Baltic Sea; the sailors of Gotland sailed up rivers as far away as Novgorod, which was a major trade centre of Rus'. Scandinavians led international trade in the Baltic area before the Hanseatic League, establishing major trading hubs at Birka, Haithabu, and Schleswig by the 9th century CE. The later Hanseatic ports between Mecklenburg and  Königsberg (present-day Kaliningrad) originally formed part of the Scandinavian-led Baltic trade-system.

The Hanseatic League was never formally founded, so it lacks a date of founding. Historians traditionally traced its origins to the rebuilding of the north German town of Lübeck in 1159 by the powerful Henry the Lion, Duke of Saxony and Bavaria, after he had captured the area from Adolf II, Count of Schauenburg and Holstein. More recent scholarship has deemphasized the focus on Lübeck, viewing it as one of several regional trading centers.

German cities achieved domination of trade in the Baltic with striking speed during the 13th century, and Lübeck became a central node in the seaborne trade that linked the areas around the  North and  Baltic seas. The hegemony of Lübeck peaked during the 15th century.

Foundation and early development 
Well before the term Hanse appeared in a document in 1267,
merchants in different cities began to form guilds, or hansas, with the intention of trading with towns overseas, especially in the economically less-developed eastern Baltic. This area could supply timber, wax, amber, resins, and furs, along with rye and wheat brought down on barges from the hinterland to port markets. Merchant guilds formed in both hometowns and destination ports as medieval corporations (universitates mercatorum), and despite competition would increasingly cooperate to coalesce into the Hanseatic network of merchant guilds. The dominant language of trade was Middle Low German, which had significant impact on the languages spoken in the area, particularly the larger Scandinavian languages, Estonian, and Latvian.

Lübeck soon became a base for merchants from Saxony and Westphalia trading eastward and northward;  for them, because of its shorter and easier access route and better legal protections, it was a more attractive port than Schleswig. It became a transshipment port for trade between the North Sea and the Baltic too. In addition, Lübeck granted extensive trade privileges to Russian and Scandinavian traders. It was also the main supply port for the Northern Crusades, improving its relations with the Pope. Lübeck gained imperial privileges to become a free imperial city in 1226, under Valdemar II of Denmark during the Danish dominion, as had Hamburg in 1189. Also in this period Wismar, Rostock, Stralsund and Danzig received city charters.

Visby, on the island of Gotland, functioned as the leading centre in the Baltic before the Hansa. Sailing east, Visby merchants established a trading post at Novgorod called Gutagard (also known as Gotenhof) in 1080. Gotland became separate from Sweden after 1120 and allowed traders from the south and west. Merchants from northern Germany from then on stayed there in the early period of the Gotlander settlement, through a treaty with the Visby Hansa. Later, in the first half of the 13th century, they established their own trading station or Kontor in Novgorod, known as the Peterhof, further up the river Volkhov.

Hansa societies worked to remove restrictions on trade for their members. The earliest extant documentary mention (although without a name) of a specific German commercial federation dates between 1173 and 1175 (but commonly misdated to 1157) in London. That year, the merchants of the Hansa in Cologne convinced King Henry II of England to exempt them from all tolls in London and to grant protection to merchants and goods throughout England.

German colonists in the 12th and 13th centuries settled in numerous cities on and near the east Baltic coast, such as Elbing (Elbląg), Thorn (Toruń), Reval (Tallinn), Riga, and Dorpat (Tartu), which became members of the Hanseatic League, and some of which still retain many Hansa buildings and bear the style of their Hanseatic days. Most were granted Lübeck law, after the league's most prominent town. The law provided that they had to appeal in all legal matters to Lübeck's city council. Others, like Danzig from 1295, had Magdeburg law or its derivative Culm law. Later the Livonian Confederation of 1435 to  incorporated modern-day Estonia and parts of Latvia; all of its major towns were members of the Hanseatic League.

Over the 13th century, older and wealthier long-distance traders increasingly settled in their hometowns as senior trade partners, while they previously became landowners. Already in older times merchants had often begun partnerships or private companies. Factors, who were junior partners or associates, were instead sent to foreign places and settled on location. By the end of the century foreign long-distance trade had developed a division of labor with three roles: the settled senior merchant, the transporter (skipper, carrier or land carter) and the factor abroad. But inside the area of Hanseatic towns travelling representatives were sent on individual trade expeditions. The larger number of settled merchants allowed long-istance traders to influence town policy more, combined with an increased presence of the ministerial class this raised the rank of merchants and enabled them to dominate more cities.

In 1241 Lübeck, which had access to the Baltic and North seas' fishing grounds, formed an alliance—a precursor to the League—with Hamburg, another trading city, which controlled access to salt-trade routes from Lüneburg. The allied cities gained control over most of the salt-fish trade, especially the Scania Market; Cologne joined them in the Diet of 1260. The towns raised their own armies, with each guild required to provide levies when needed. The Hanseatic cities came to the aid of one another, and commercial ships often had to be used to carry soldiers and their arms. Over the period, a network of alliances grew to include a flexible roster of 70 to 170 cities.

In the West, cities of the Rhineland like Cologne enjoyed trading privileges in Flanders and England. In 1266 King Henry III of England granted the Lübeck and Hamburg Hansa a charter for operations in England, initially causing competition with the Westphalians. But the Cologne Hansa and the Wendish Hansa joined in 1282 to form the Hanseatic colony in London, although they didn't completely merge until the 15th century.There were blockades against Novgorod in 1268 and 1277/1278. Nonetheless Westphalian traders continued to dominate trade on London and also Ipswich and Colchester, while Baltic and Wendish traders concentrated between King's Lynn and Newcastle upon Tyne. Much of the drive for co-operation came from the fragmented nature of existing territorial governments, which failed to provide security for trade. Over the next 50 years, the merchant Hansa solidified with formal agreements for confederation and co-operation covering the west and east trade routes. Cities not only from the east modernday Low Countries, but also Utrecht, Holland, Zealand, Brabant, Namur and modern Limburg began to participate from the thirteenth century. This network of Hanseatic trading guilds is called the Kaufmannshanse in the historiography.

Commercial expansion 

The League succeeded in establishing additional Kontors in Bruges (Flanders),  Bergen (Norway), and London (England) beside the Peterhof in Novgorod. These trading posts were institutionalised by the first half of the 14th century at the latest (for Bergen and Bruges) and, except for Bruges, became significant enclaves. The London Kontor, the Steelyard (Middle Low German stâlhof, German Stahlhof), is first alluded to in the De itinere navali, an account of crusaders from Lübeck for whom the Kontor arranged the purchase of a replacement cog in the summer of 1189. It was formally established in 1320, stood west of London Bridge near Upper Thames Street, on the site now occupied by Cannon Street station. It grew into a significant walled community with its own warehouses, weighhouse, church, offices and houses, reflecting the importance and scale of trading activity on the premises. The first reference to it as the Steelyard occurs in 1422. A Latin quotation from 1394 has: In civitate Londonia ... in Curia Calibis.

In addition to the major Kontors, individual ports with Hanseatic trading outposts or factories had a representative merchant and warehouse. Often they were not permanently manned. In Scania, Denmark, there were around 30 Hanseatic seasonal factories for traders in salted herring, these were called vitten and were granted considerable legal autonomy to the extent that Burkhardt argues that they resembled a fifth kontor and would be seen as such if not for their early decline. The Scanian herring fairs drew large numbers from the Wendish towns, who consolidated the herring trade through an integral approach where they supplied their own salt, but also traders from elsewhere in Scandinavia or from the lands around the North Sea attended. In England there were factories in Boston (the outpost was also called the Stalhof), Bristol, Bishop's Lynn (now King's Lynn, which features the sole remaining Hanseatic warehouse in England), Hull, Ipswich, Newcastle upon Tyne, Norwich, Scarborough, Yarmouth (now Great Yarmouth), and York, many of which were important for the Baltic trade and become centres of cloth industry in the late 14th century. Hansards and cloth manufacturers coordinated to make fabrics meet local demand and fashion in the traders' hometowns. Outposts in Lisbon, Bordeaux, Bourgneuf, La Rochelle and Nantes offered the cheaper Bay salt. Ships that plied this trade sailed home in the salt fleet. There were also trading posts in Flanders, Denmark-Norway, the Baltic interior, Upper Germany, Iceland and Venice.

Starting with trade in coarse woollen fabrics, the Hanseatic League had the effect of bringing both commerce and industry to northern Germany. As trade increased, newer and finer woollen and linen fabrics, and even silks, were manufactured in northern Germany. The same refinement of products out of cottage industry occurred in other fields, e.g. etching, wood carving, armour production, engraving of metals, and  wood-turning.

The league primarily traded beeswax, furs, timber, resin (or tar), flax, honey, wheat, and rye from the east to Flanders and England with cloth, in particular broadcloth, (and, increasingly, manufactured goods) going in the other direction. Metal ore (principally copper and iron) and herring came southwards from Sweden, the Carpathians were another important source of copper and iron, often sold in Thorn. Lubeck also had a vital role in the salt trade; salt was acquired in Lunenburg or shipped from France and Portugal and sold on Central European markets, taken to Scania for salting herring or exported to Russia. Stockfish was traded from Bergen. The league also traded in beer, with beer from Hanseatic towns the most valued, and Wendish cities like Lübeck, Hamburg, Wismar and Rostock developed export breweries for hopped beer.

Hanseatic trade was not exclusively maritime trade, or even overwater trade. Most Hanseatic towns did not have immediate access to the sea and there were many that were linked to partners by river trade or even generally expensive land trade. These combined into an integrated network and many smaller Hanseatic towns had their main trading activity in subregional trade. Internal Hanseatic trade was in fact the Hanse's quantitatively most voluminous and important business. Trade over rivers and land was not tied to specific Hanseatic privileges, but sea ports like Bremen, Hamburg and Riga managed to dominate trade on their rivers. This was not possible for the Rhine where trade retained an open character. Digging canals for trade routes was very uncommon, but the Stecknitz Canal was built between Lübeck and Lauenburg from 1391 to 1398.

Protection and defence
The Hanseatic League, at first the merchant hansas and eventually its cities, relied on power to secure protection and gain and preserve privileges. Bandits and pirates were also persistent problems, during wars these could be joined by privateers. Traders could be arrested abroad and their goods could be confiscated. The league sought to codify protection; internal treaties established mutual defence and external treaties codified privileges.

Many locals, merchant and noble alike, envied the power of the League and tried to diminish it. For example, in London, the local merchants exerted continuing pressure for the revocation of privileges. Most foreign cities confined the Hanseatic traders to certain trading areas and to their own trading posts. They seldom interacted with the local inhabitants, except when doing business. The refusal of the Hansa to offer reciprocal arrangements to their counterparts exacerbated the tension.

The merchants of the Hanseatic League succeeded in using their economic power to pressure cities and rulers. It could call embargoes, redirect trade away from towns and even boycott entire countries. There were blockades against Novgorod in 1268 and 1277/1278. Bruges was pressured by moving temporarily the Hanseatic emporium to Aardenburg from 1280 to 1282, from 1307 or 1308 to 1310  and in 1350, to Dordt in 1358 and 1388, and to Antwerp in 1436. There were blockades against Novgorod in 1268 and 1277/1278. Boycotts against Norway in 1284 and Flanders in 1358 almost caused famines there. They sometimes resorted to their military might, several Hanseatic cities maintained their own warships and in times of need merchant ships could be repurposed. But military action against political powers often didn't involve the entire league. Instead an ad hoc coalition of stakeholders, called an alliance (tohopesate), was often formed.

As an essential part of protecting their investment in ships and their cargoes, League members trained pilots and erected lighthouses, like the still working Kõpu Lighthouse, and other lights. Lübeck also erected in 1202 what's claimed to be the first lighthouse proper in northern Europe in Falsterbo. There were by 1600 at least 15 lights erected along the German and Scandinavian coasts making it the best lighted sea area then in the world, largely thanks to the Hansa.

Zenith 

The weakening of imperial power and imperial protection for merchants under the late Hohenstaufen dynasty forced the Hanseatic League to institutionalise into a cooperating network of cities with a fluid structure, called the Städtehanse in the historiography, but it never became a closely managed formal organisation and the Kaufmannshanse continued to exist by its side. This development was delayed by the conquest of many Wendish cities by the Danish king Eric VI Menved or by their feudal overlords between 1306 and 1319 and the restriction of their autonomy. Assemblies of the Hanse towns met irregularly in Lübeck for a Hansetag (Hanseatic Diet), some argue from about 1300, while others date the first diet to 1356. But many towns chose not to attend nor to send representatives, and decisions were not binding on individual cities if their delegates were not included in the recesses; representatives would sometimes leave the Diet prematurely in an attempt to give their towns an excuse not to ratify decisions. Only a very small number of Hanseatic cities were free imperial cities or enjoyed comparable autonomy and liberties, but many cities temporarily gained limited autonomy from their overlords.

Between 1361 and 1370 members of the league waged war against Denmark. Initially unsuccessful with a Wendish offensive, Prussian, Dutch and eventually Wendish towns in 1368 allied in the Confederation of Cologne, sacked Copenhagen and Helsingborg, and forced Valdemar IV, King of Denmark, and his son-in-law Haakon VI, King of Norway, to grant consirable incomes and influence over Øresund fortresses for 15 years in the subsequent peace treaty of Stralsund in 1370. It extended privileges in Scania to the wider Hanseatic League, too, including the towns of Holland and Zeeland. This favourable treaty marked the height of Hanseatic influence; for this period the Hanseatic League has in the past been called a "Northern European great power". The Confederation of Cologne lasted until 1385, the Øresund fortresses were returned to Denmark the same year.

After Valdemar's heir Olav died, a succession dispute erupted over Denmark and Norway between Albert of Mecklenburg, King of Sweden and Margaret I, Queen of Denmark. This was further complicated when Swedish nobles rebelled against Albert and invited Margaret. Albert hired privateers in 1392, the Victual Brothers. They and their descendants threatened maritime trade of the league between 1392 and the 1430s with their raids. From 1395 to 1398 Stockholm was ruled by a consortium of 7 Hanseatic cities under the release agreement for Albert of Mecklenburg, and enjoyed full Hanseatic trading privileges. The Victual Brothers still controlled Gotland in 1398, when it was conquered by the Teutonic Order with support from the Prussian towns; Gotland was transferred to Denmark in 1408. The grandmaster of the Teutonic Order was often seen as head of the Hanse (caput Hansae), not only abroad.

Rise of rival powers 
In the 15th century the League became more formally institutionalised and more regionalised. This was in part a response to challenges in governance or competition with rivals, but also a result of changes in trade. A slow shift occurred from Hanseatic cities' loose participation to formal recognition of membership, but only if a city's use of the Hanseatic privileges was controversial.

Russian principalities gained trading privileges in 1392 in Livonia and on Gotland in exchange for renewing the German privileges, after conflict since the 1380s. English traders also received trade privileges in Prussia with the treaties of Marienburg and became prominent in the trade there, after extended conflicts from the 1370s till the early 1400s. The importance of Hanseatic trade in England decreased during the 15th century.

The Hanseatic cities of Holland and Zealandic had participated in the Hansa as late as 1394, but in 1395 they were prevented from cooperation by feudal obligations to Albert I, Duke of Bavaria who warred against the Frisians. Their Hanseatic ties began to come loose and their economies started to develop in another direction. When Holland and Zealand became between 1417 and 1432 slowly part of the Burgundian State, there was even more drastic economic reorientation.

In the 15th century, tensions between the Prussian region and the "Wendish" cities (Lübeck and its eastern neighbours) increased. Lübeck was dependent on its role as centre of the Hansa, being on the shore of the sea without a major river. It was on the entrance of the land route to Hamburg, but this land route could be bypassed by sea travel around Denmark and through the Kattegat. Prussia's main interest, on the other hand, was the export of bulk products like grain and timber, which were very important for England, the Low Countries, and, later on, also for Spain and Italy.

Lübeck was in financial troubles from 1403 and dissenting craftsmen established in 1405 a supervising committee of 60. A constitutional crisis broke out in 1408 when the committee of 60 rebelled and put a new town council in place. Similar revolts broke out in Wismar and Rostock and new town councils were establisged in 1410. The crisis was only ended in 1418 by compromise.

Eric of Pomerania succeeded Margaret of Denmark in 1412, sought to expand into Schleswig and Holstein and levied tolls at the Øresund. Hanseatic cities were divided initially, Lübeck tried to appease Eric while Hamburg supported the Schauenburg cunts of Holstein. The Danish-Hanseatic War eventually began in 1426. After the Bombardment of Copenhagen, the Treaty of Vordingborg renewed the commercial privileges in 1435 but the Øresund tolls continued. Eric of Pomerania was deposed in 1438 or 1439 by Denmark, Sweden and Norway. In 1438 Lübeck took control of the Øresund toll for a while. This caused tension with Holland and Zeeland. The Sound tolls and the later attempt of Lübeck to exclude the English and Dutch merchants from Scania, harmed the Scanian herring trade in the long term when the excluded regions began to develop their own herring industries.

In the Dutch–Hanseatic War (1438–1441), a privateer war mostly waged by Wendish towns, the merchants of Amsterdam sought and eventually won free access to the Baltic. Although the blockade of the grain trade hurt Holland and Zeeland more than Hanseatic cities, it was against Prussian interest to maintain it.

The economic crises of the late 15th century did not spare the Hansa. Nevertheless, its eventual rivals emerged in the form of the territorial states, whether new or revived. New vehicles of credit were imported from Italy.

A general trend over the 15th century was that the Hanseatic hometowns increasingly introduced new statures into the kontors' legislation, especially after 1474. Only the Bergen kontor grew more independent in this period.

Frederick II, Elector of Brandenburg, tried to assert authority over the Hanseatic towns Berlin and Cölln in 1442 and blocked all towns of Brandenburg from participating in Hanseatic diets. For some but not all Brandenburg towns this was the end of their Hanseatic involvement. In 1488 John Cicero, Elector of Brandenburg did the same to Stendal and Salzwedel in the Altmark.

In 1454, the year of the marriage of Elisabeth of Austria to King-Grand Duke Casimir IV Jagiellon of Poland-Lithuania, the towns of the Prussian Confederation rose up against the dominance of the Teutonic Order and asked Casimir IV for help. Gdańsk (Danzig), Thorn and Elbing became part of the Kingdom of Poland, (from 1466 to 1569 referred to as Royal Prussia, region of Poland) by the Second Peace of Thorn.

Poland in turn was heavily supported by the Holy Roman Empire through family connections and by military assistance under the Habsburgs. Kraków, then the capital of Poland, had a loose association with the Hansa. The Hansa-dominated maritime grain trade made Poland one of the main areas of its activity, helping Danzig to become the Hansa's largest city. The Polish kings soon began to reduce the towns' political freedoms.

The Griffin dukes of Pomerania from the middle of the fifteenth century began constant conflicts to bring the Pomeranian Hanseatic towns under their control. This was not very successful at first, but Bogislav X subjugated Stettin and Köslin and harmed the economy and restricted the independence of many other towns.

In 1567, a Hanseatic League agreement reconfirmed previous obligations and rights of league members, such as common protection and defense against enemies. The Prussian Quartier cities of Thorn, Elbing, Königsberg and Riga and Dorpat also signed. When pressed by the King of Poland–Lithuania, Danzig remained neutral and would not allow ships running for Poland into its territory. They had to anchor somewhere else, such as at Pautzke (Puck).

A major economic advantage for the Hansa was its control of the shipbuilding market, mainly in Lübeck and Danzig. The League sold ships throughout Europe. When the Dutch started to become competitors of the Hansa, it tried to stop Holland from getting ships or shipbuilding technology. Danzig, a trading partner of Amsterdam, attempted to forestall the decision. Dutch ships sailed to Danzig to take grain from the city directly, to the dismay of Lübeck. Hollanders also circumvented the Hanse towns by trading directly with north German princes in non-Hanseatic towns. Dutch freight costs were much lower than those of the Hansa, and the Hansa were excluded as middlemen.

When Bruges, Antwerp and Holland all became part of the Duchy of Burgundy they actively tried to take over the monopoly of trade from the Hansa, and the staples market from Bruges was transferred to Amsterdam. The Dutch merchants aggressively challenged the Hansa and met with much success. Hanseatic cities in Prussia, Livonia, supported the Dutch against the core cities of the Hansa in northern Germany. After several naval wars between Burgundy and the Hanseatic fleets, Amsterdam gained the position of leading port for Polish and Baltic grain from the late 15th century onwards.

Nuremberg in Franconia developed an overland route to sell formerly Hansa-monopolised products from Frankfurt via Nuremberg and Leipzig to Poland and Russia, trading Flemish cloth and French wine in exchange for grain and furs from the east. The Hansa profited from the Nuremberg trade by allowing Nurembergers to settle in Hanseatic towns, which the Franconians exploited by taking over trade with Sweden as well. The Nuremberger merchant Albrecht Moldenhauer was influential in developing the trade with Sweden and Norway, and his sons Wolf Moldenhauer and Burghard Moldenhauer established themselves in Bergen and Stockholm, becoming leaders of the local Hanseatic activities.

King Edward IV of England reconfirmed the league's privileges in the Treaty of Utrecht despite the latent hostility, in part thanks to the significant financial contribution the League made to the Yorkist side during the Wars of the Roses of 1455–1487. Tsar Ivan III of Russia closed the Hanseatic Kontor at Novgorod in 1494 and deported its merchants to Moscow. It was an attempt to reduce Hanseaticinfluence on Russian trade. At the time only 49 traders were at the Peterhof. The fur trade was redirected to Leipzig, taking out the Hansards; while the Hanseatic trade with Russia moved to Risa, Reval and Pleskau. When the Peterhof reopened in 1514, Novgorod wasn't a trade hub any longer. The very existence of the League and its privileges and monopolies created economic and social tensions that often crept over into rivalries between League members.

End of the Hansa 

The trends of local feudal lords asserting control over towns and suppressing their autonomy, and of foreign rulers repressing Hanseatic traders continued in the next century.

In the Swedish War of Liberation 1521-1523 the Hanseatic League was successful in opposition in an economic conflict it had over the trade, mining and metal industry in Bergslagen (the main mining area of Sweden in the 16th century) with Jakob Fugger (early extremely rich industrialist in the mining and metal industry on the continent) and his unfriendly business take-over attempt. Fugger allied with his financially dependent pope Leo X, Maximilian I, Holy Roman Emperor and Christian II of Denmark/Norway. Both sides made huge costly investments in support of larger amounts of expensive hired mercenaries to win the war. The Hanseatic League fully restored its power in Gustav Vasa's Sweden and Frederick I's Denmark, 1523 after the war.

However, the Hanseatic League ended up on the wrong side in 1536 after Christian III's victory in the Count's Feud in Scania and Denmark. With Sweden as his ally, money was gone, and the Hanseatic League's influence in the Nordic countries was over. After that the Hanseatic League was only seen as an unwanted competitor by Denmark-Norway and Sweden.

The Hanseatic towns of Guelders were obstructed in the 1530s by Charles II, Duke of Guelders. The strict Catholic Charles objected to the Lutheranism, in his words "Lutheran heresy", of Lübeck and other north German cities. This frustrated but did not end the towns' Hanseatic trade and there was a small resurgence later.

Later in the 16th century, Denmark-Norway took control of much of the Baltic Sea. Sweden had regained control over its own trade, the Kontor in Novgorod had closed, and the Kontor in Bruges had become effectively moribund. The individual cities making up the league had also started to put self-interest before their common Hanseatic interests. Finally, the political authority of the German princes had started to grow, constraining the independence of the Hanse's merchants and towns.

The league attempted to deal with some of these issues: it created the post of Syndic in 1556 and elected Heinrich Sudermann as a permanent official with legal training, who worked to protect and extend the diplomatic agreements of the member towns. In 1557 and 1579 revised agreements spelled out the duties of towns and some progress was made. The Bruges Kontor moved to Antwerp and the Hansa attempted to pioneer new routes. However the league proved unable to prevent the growing mercantile competition, and so a long decline commenced.

The moribund Antwerp Kontor closed in 1593. In 1597 Queen Elizabeth of England expelled the League from London, and the Steelyard closed and sequestered in 1598. The Kontor was returned in 1606 under King James but it couldn't recover. The Bergen Kontor continued until 1754; of all the Kontore, only its buildings, the Bryggen, survive.

Not all states tried to suppress their cities' former Hanseatic links, the Dutch Republic encouraged its eastern former members to maintain ties with the remaining Hanseatic League. The States-General relied on those cities in diplomacy at the time of the Kalmar War.

The Thirty Years War was destructive for the Hanseatic League and members suffered heavily from both the imperials, the Danes and the Swedes. At the beginning Saxon and Wendish faced attacks because of the desire of Christian IV of Denmark to control the Elbe and Weser. Pomerania had a very strong population decline. Sweden took Bremen-Verden (excluding the city of Bremen), Swedish Pomerania (including Stralsund, Greifswald, Rostock) and Swedish Wismar, preventing their cities from participating in the League, and controlled the Oder, Weser and Elbe, and could levy tolls on their traffic. The league became increasingly irrelevant despite its inclusion in the Peace of Westphalia.

By the late 17th century, the league had imploded and could no longer deal with its own internal struggles. The social and political changes that accompanied the Protestant Reformation included the rise of Dutch and English merchants and the pressure of the Ottoman Empire upon the Holy Roman Empire and its trade routes.

In 1666, the Steelyard in London was burned down by the Great Fire of London. The Kontor-manager sent a letter to Lübeck appealing for immediate financial assistance for a reconstruction. Hamburg, Bremen, and Lübeck called for a Hanseatic Day in 1669. Only a few cities participated and those who came were very reluctant to contribute financially to the reconstruction. It was the last formal meeting, without any of the parties knowing it would be the last. This date is often taken in retrospect as the effective end date of the Hansa, but the Hansa was never formally disbanded. It simply disintegrated and petered out silently.

After disintegration 
The Hanseatic League, however, lived on in the public mind. Leopold I even requested Lübeck to call a Tagfahrt to rally support for him against the Turks.

Lübeck, Hamburg and Bremen continued to attempt common diplomacy, although interests had already diverged by the Peace of Ryswick. Nonetheless, the Hanseatic Republics were able to jointly perform some diplomacy, such as a joint delegation to the United States in 1827, led by Vincent Rumpff; later the U.S. established a consulate to the Hanseatic and Free Cities from 1857 to 1862. Britain maintained diplomats to the Hanseatic Cities until the unification of Germany in 1871. The three cities also had a common "Hanseatic" representation in Berlin until 1920.

Three kontors also remained as, often unused, Hanseatic property after the League's effective disbandment, as the Peterhof was already closed in the 16th century. Bryggen was sold to Norwegian owners in 1754. The Steelyard in London and the Oostershuis in Antwerp were long impossible to sell. The Steelyard was finally sold in 1852 and the Oosterhuis, closed in 1593, was sold in 1862.

Hamburg, Bremen, and Lübeck remained as the only members until the League's formal end in 1862, on the eve of the 1867 founding of the North German Confederation and the 1871 founding of the German Empire under Kaiser Wilhelm I. Despite its collapse, they still cherished the link to the Hanseatic League. Until German reunification, these three cities were the only ones that retained the words "Hanseatic City" in their official German names. Hamburg and Bremen continue to style themselves officially as "free Hanseatic cities", with Lübeck named "Hanseatic City". For Lübeck in particular, this anachronistic tie to a glorious past remained important in the 20th century. In 1937, the Nazi Party revoked its imperial immediacy through the Greater Hamburg Act. Since 1990, 24 other German cities have adopted this title.

Organization 

The members of the Hanseatic League were Low German merchants, whose towns were, with the exception of Dinant, where these merchants held citizenship. Not all towns with Low German merchant communities were members of the league (e.g., Emden, Memel (today Klaipėda), Viborg (today Vyborg) and Narva never joined). However, Hansards could also come from settlements without German town law—the premise for league membership was birth to German parents, subjection to German law, and a commercial education. The league served to advance and defend the common interests of its heterogeneous members: commercial ambitions such as enhancement of trade, and political ambitions such as ensuring maximum independence from the noble territorial rulers.The Hanseatic League was by no means a monolithic organization or a 'state within a state' but rather a complex and loose-jointed confederation of protagonists pursuing their own interests, which coincided in a shared program of economic domination in the Baltic region.

Decisions and actions of the Hanseatic League were the consequence of a consensus-based procedure. If an issue arose, the league's members were invited to participate in a central meeting, the Tagfahrt (Hanseatic Diet, "meeting ride", sometimes also referred to as Hansetag), that some argue already happened around 1300 but were formalised since 1358; some date the first diet to 1356. The member communities then chose envoys (Ratssendeboten) to represent their local consensus on the issue at the Diet. Not every community sent an envoy; delegates were often entitled to represent a set of communities. Consensus-building on local and Tagfahrt levels followed the Low Saxon tradition of Einung, where consensus was defined as absence of protest: after a discussion, the proposals which gained sufficient support were dictated aloud to the scribe and passed as binding Rezess if the attendees did not object; those favouring alternative proposals unlikely to get sufficient support were obliged to remain silent during this procedure. If consensus could not be established on a certain issue, it was found instead in the appointment of a number of league members who were then empowered to work out a compromise.

The Hanseatic League was characterised by legal pluralism and the diets couldn't issue laws. But the cities cooperated to achieve limited trade regulation, like measures against fraud, or worked together on a regional level. There was also interest in harmonising maritime law, a long series of ordinances on maritime law was issued in the 15th and 16th centuries. The most extensive maritime ordinance was the Ship Ordinance and Sea Law of 1614, but it's dubious that it was ever enforced.

Kontors 

The Hanseatic Kontore, which operated like an early stock exchange, were settlements of Hansards and organised in the mid 14th century as private corporations that each had their own treasury, court, legislation and seal.They were probably established first to provide security, but also served to secure privileges and engage in diplomacy. The quality of goods was also examined at kontors, increasing the efficiency of trade, and the kontors served as bases to develop connections with local rulers and as sources of economic and political information. Most kontors were also physical locations containing several buildings, that were integrated and segregated from citylife to different degrees. The kontor of Bruges was an exception, it didn't acquire any building until the 15th century. Like the guilds, the Kontore were usually led by Ältermänner ("eldermen", or English aldermen). The Stalhof, as a special case, had a Hanseatic and an English alderman. In Novgorod the aldermen were replaced by a hofknecht in the 15th century. The kontors' statutes were read aloud to the present merchants once a year.

In 1347 the Kontor of Bruges modified its statute to ensure an equal representation of the league's members. To that end, member communities from different regions were pooled into three circles (Drittel ("third [part]"): the Wendish and Saxon Drittel, the Westphalian and Prussian Drittel as well as the Gothlandian, Livonian and Swedish Drittel). The merchants from their respective Drittel would then each choose two aldermen and six members of the Eighteen Men's Council (Achtzehnmännerrat) to administer the Kontor for a set period of time.

In 1356, during a Hanseatic meeting in preparation of the first Tagfahrt, the league confirmed this statute. All trader settlements including the Kontors were subordinated to the Diet's decisions around this time, and their envoys also received the right to attend and speak at Diets but they lacked voting power.

Drittel 
The league in general gradually adopted and institutionalized the division into Drittel (see table).

The Hansetag was the only central institution of the Hanseatic League. However, with the division into Drittel ("thirds"), the members of the respective subdivisions frequently held a Dritteltage ("Drittel meeting") to work out common positions which could then be presented at a Hansetag. On a more local level, league members also met, and while such regional meetings were never formalized into a Hanseatic institution, they gradually gained importance in the process of preparing and implementing a Diet's decisions.

Quarters 
From 1554, the division into Drittel was modified to reduce the circles' heterogeneity, to enhance the collaboration of the members on a local level and thus to make the league's decision-making process more efficient. The number of circles rose to four, so they were called Quartiere (quarters):

This division was however not adopted by the Kontore, who, for their purposes (like Ältermänner elections), grouped the league members in different ways (e.g., the division adopted by the Stalhof in London in 1554 grouped the league members into Dritteln, whereby Lübeck merchants represented the Wendish, Pomeranian Saxon and several Westphalian towns, Cologne merchants represented the Cleves, Mark, Berg and Dutch towns, while Danzig merchants represented the Prussian and Livonian towns).

Hanseatic ships 
A number of different types of ships was used in the Hanseatic League for transport over sea and inland waters.

The type that was the most used by the Hansa, and the most emblematic, was the cog. The cog was a multi-purpose clinker-built ship with carvel bottom, a stern rudder and a square rigged mast. Most cogs were privately owned merchant ships, but they were also used as warships. It was built in a variety of sizes and specifications and was used to navigate seas and rivers. They could be outfitted with castles starting from the thirteenth century. The cog was depicted on many seals and several coats of arms of Hanseatic cities, like Stralsund, Elbląg and Wismar. Several ship wrecks of cogs have been found. The most famous one is the well preserved Bremen cog. It could carry a cargo of about 125 tons. The hulk began to replace the cog by 1400 and cogs lost their dominance to them around 1450.

The hulk was a bulkier ship that could carry larger loads; Elbl estimates they could carry up to 500 tons by the 15th century. It could be clinker or carvel-built. No archeological evidence of a hulk has been found.

In 1464 Danzig acquired a French carvel ship through a legal dispute and renamed it the Peter von Danzig. It was 40 m long and had three masts, being one of the largest ships of its time. Danzig adopted carvel construction around 1470, other cities also shifted to carvel type starting from this time. An example is the Jesus of Lübeck, later sold to England for use as a warship and slave ship.

The galleonlike carvel warship Adler von Lübeck was constructed by Lübeck for military use against Sweden during the Northern Seven Years' War (1563–70), launched in 1566, but was never put to military use after the Treaty of Stettin. It was the biggest ship of its day at 78 m long and had four masts, including a bonaventure mizzen. It served as a merchant ship until it was damaged in 1581 on a return voyage from Lisbon and broken up in 1588.

Lists of former Hanseatic cities

Hansa Proper
In the hidden table below, the names listed in the column labelled Quarter have been summarised as follows: 
 "Wendish": Wendish and Pomeranian (or just Wendish) Quarter
 "Saxon": Saxon, Thuringian and Brandenburg (or just Saxon) Quarter
 "Baltic": Prussian, Livonian and Swedish (or East Baltic) Quarter
 "Westphalian": Rhine-Westphalian and Netherlands (including Flanders) (or Rhineland) Quarter

The remaining column headings are as follows:
 City – the city's name, with any variants
 Territory – the jurisdiction to which the city was subject at the time of the League
 Now –  the modern nation-state in which the city is located
 From and Until –  the dates at which the city joined and/or left the league
 Notes – additional details about the city 
 Ref. – one or more references to works about the city

Kontore
The Kontore were the major foreign trading posts of the League, not cities that were Hanseatic members, and are listed in the hidden table below.

Vitten
The vitten were significant foreign trading posts of the League in Scania, not cities that were Hanseatic members, they are argued by some to have been similar in status to the kontors, and are listed in the hidden table below.

Ports with Hansa trading posts 
 

 Åhus
 Berwick-upon-Tweed
 Bishop's Lynn (King's Lynn)
 Boston
 Bordeaux
 Bourgneuf
 Bristol
 Copenhagen
 Damme
 Frankfurt
 Ghent
 Hull (Kingston upon Hull)
 Ipswich
 Kalundborg
 Kaunas
 Landskrona
 La Rochelle
 Leith 
 Lisbon
 Nantes
 Narva
 Næstved
 Newcastle
 Norwich
 Nuremberg
 Oslo
 Pleskau (Pskov)
 Polotsk
 Rønne
 Scarborough
 Yarmouth (Great Yarmouth)
 Sluis
 Smolensk
 Tønsberg
 Venice
 Vilnius
 Vitebsk
 York
 Ystad

Other cities with a Hansa community 
 

 Aberdeen
 Åbo (Turku)
 Avaldsnes
 Brae
 Goldingen (Kuldīga)
 Göttingen
 Grindavík
 Grundarfjörður
 Gunnister
 Haapsalu
 Hafnarfjörður
 Hanover
 Harlingen
 Haroldswick
 Hildesheim
 Hindeloopen (Hylpen)
 Kalmar
 Kokenhusen (Koknese)
 Krambatangi
 Kumbaravogur
 Leghorn
 Lemsal (Limbaži)
 Lunna Wick
 Messina
 Minden
 Naples
 Nordhausen
 Nyborg
 Nyköping
 Roop (Straupe)
 Scalloway
 Stockholm
 Tórshavn
 Trondheim
 Tver
 Uelzen
 Walk (Valka)
 Weißenstein (Paide)
 Wenden (Cēsis)
 Wesenberg (Rakvere)
 Windau (Ventspils)
 Wolmar (Valmiera)

Legacy

Historiography 
Academic historiography of the Hanseatic League is considered to begin with Georg Sartorius, who started writing his first work in 1795 and founded the liberal historiographical tradition about the Hanseatic League. The German conservative nationalist historiographical tradition was first published with F.W. Barthold's Geschichte der Deutschen Hansa of 1853/1854. The conservative view was associated with Little German ideology and came to predominate until the end of the First World War. Hanseatic history was used to justify a stronger German navy and conservative historians drew a link between the League and the rise of Prussia as the leading German state.

Issues of social, cultural and economic history became more important in German research after the First World War. But a leading historian like Fritz Rörig also promoted a National Socialist perspective. After the Second World War the conservative nationalist view was forsaken, allowing exchanges between German, Swedish and Norwegian historians on the Hanseatic League's role in Sweden and Norway. Views on the League were very negative in those countries, as they still are in Denmark. Philippe Dollinger's book The German Hansa became the standard work in the 60s. From that period the dominant perspective has been of loosely aligned trading network bridging several northern European markets. Marxist historians in the GDR were split on whether the League was a "late feudal" or "proto-capitalist" phenomenon.

There are two museums in Europe dedicated specifically to the history of the Hanseatic League: the European Hansemuseum in Lübeck and the Hanseatic Museum and Schøtstuene in Bergen.

Popular views 
From the 19th century Hanseatic history was often used to promote a national cause in Germany. German liberals built a fictional literature around Jürgen Wullenwever, that contained fierce anti-Danish sentiment. Hanseatic subjects were used to propagate nation building, colonialism, fleet building and warfare, and the League was presented as a bringer of culture and pioneer of German expansion.

The preoccupation with a strong navy motivated German painters since the 19th century to paint supposedly Hanseatic ships. They used the traditions of maritime paintings and, not wanting Hanseatic ships to look unimpressive, ignored historical evidence to fictionalise cogs into tall two- or three-masted ships. The depictions were widely reproduced, like on plates of Norddeutscher Lloyd. This misleading artistic tradition influenced public perception for the entire 20th century.

In the late 19th century a social-critical view developed, where opponents of the League like the likedeelers were presented as heroes and liberators from economic oppression. This was very popular from the end of the First World War into the 30s, and lives on in the Störtebeker Festival on Rügen, founded as the Rügenfestspiele by the GDR.

From the late 1970s the Europeanness and cooperation of the Hanseatic League has come to prominence in popular culture. It also is associated with innovation, enterpreneurism and internationalness in economic circles. In this way it  often used for tourism, city branding and commercial marketing. The League's unique governance structure has been identified as a precursor to the supranational model of the European Union.

Modern transnational organisations named after the Hanseatic League

Union of Cities THE HANSA 

In 1979 Zwolle invited over 40 cities from West Germany, the Netherlands, Sweden and Norway with historic links to the Hanseatic League to sign the recesses of 1669, at Zwolle's 750 year city rights' anniversary in August of the next year. In 1980, those cities established a "new Hanse" in Zwolle, named Städtebund Die Hanse (Union of Cities THE HANSA) in German and reinstituted the Hanseatic diets. This league is open to all former Hanseatic League members and cities that share a Hanseatic heritage.

In 2012 the city league had 187 members. This includes twelve Russian cities, most notably Novgorod, and 21 Polish cities. No Danish cities have joined the Union of Cities. The "new Hanse" fosters business links, tourism and cultural exchange.

The headquarters of the New Hansa is in Lübeck, Germany. The current President of the Hanseatic League of New Time is Jan Lindenau, Mayor of Lübeck.

Dutch cities including Groningen, Deventer, Kampen, Zutphen and Zwolle, and a number of German cities including Bremen, Buxtehude, Demmin, Greifswald, Hamburg, Lübeck, Lüneburg, Rostock, Salzwedel, Stade, Stendal, Stralsund, Uelzen and Wismar now call themselves Hanse cities (the German cities' car license plates are prefixed H, e.g. –HB– for "Hansestadt Bremen").

Each year one of the member cities of the New Hansa hosts the Hanseatic Days of New Time international festival.

In 2006, King's Lynn became the first English member of the union of cities. It was joined by Hull in 2012 and Boston in 2016.

New Hanseatic League 
The New Hanseatic League was established in February 2018 by finance ministers from Denmark, Estonia, Finland, Ireland, Latvia, Lithuania, the Netherlands and Sweden through the signing of a foundational document which set out the countries' "shared views and values in the discussion on the architecture of the EMU".

Other entities named after the Hanseatic League 
The legacy of the Hansa is remembered today in several names: the German airline Lufthansa (lit. "Air Hansa"); F.C. Hansa Rostock, nickamed the Kogge or Hansa-Kogge; Hansa-Park, one of the biggest theme parks in Germany; Hanze University of Applied Sciences in Groningen, Netherlands; Hanze oil production platform, Netherlands; the Hansa Brewery in Bergen and the Hanse Sail in Rostock; Hanseatic Trade Center in Hamburg; DDG Hansa, which was a major German shipping company from 1881 until its bankruptcy and takeover by Hapag-Lloyd in 1980; and Hansabank in Estonia, which has been rebranded into Swedbank.

Historical maps

In popular culture 
 In the Patrician series of trading simulation video games, the player assumes the role of a merchant in any of several cities of the Hanseatic League.
 In the Saga of Seven Suns series of space opera novels by American writer Kevin J. Anderson, the human race has colonized multiple planets in the Spiral Arm, most of which are governed by the powerful Terran Hanseatic League (Hansa).
 Hansa Teutonica is a German board game designed by Andreas Steding and published by Argentum Verlag in 2009.
 In the Metro franchise of post-apocalyptic novels and video games, a trading alliance of stations called The Commonwealth of the Stations of the Ring Line is also known as the Hanseatic League, usually shortened to Hansa or Hanza.

See also 

 Baltic maritime trade (c. 1400–1800)
 Bay Fleet
 Brick Gothic
 Company of Merchant Adventurers of London
 Hanseatic Cross
 Hanseatic Days of New Time
 Hanseatic flags
 Hanseatic Museum and Schøtstuene
 History of Bremen (City)
 Maritime republics
 Peasants' Republic
 Schiffskinder
 Thalassocracy

Notes

Explanatory footnotes

References

Further reading 
 
 
 
 
 Halliday, Stephen. "The First Common Market?" History Today 59 (2009): 31–37.
 Harreld, Donald J. A companion to the Hanseatic League (Brill, 2015).
 
 
 
 
 
 
 
 Wubs-Mrozewicz, Justyna, and Jenks, Stuart eds.  The Hanse in Medieval and Early Modern Europe (Leiden: Koninklijke Brill NV, 2013)

Historiography
 Cowan, Alexander. "Hanseatic League: Oxford Bibliographies Online Research Guide" (Oxford University Press, 2010) online
 Harrison, Gordon. "The Hanseatic League in Historical Interpretation." The Historian 33 (1971): 385–97. .
 Szepesi, Istvan. "Reflecting the Nation: The Historiography of Hanseatic Institutions." Waterloo Historical Review 7 (2015). online

External links 

 29th International Hansa Days in Novgorod
 30th International Hansa Days 2010 in Parnu-Estonia
 Chronology of the Hanseatic League
 Hanseatic Cities in the Netherlands
 Hanseatic League Historical Re-enactors
 Hanseatic Towns Network
 Hanseatic League related sources in the German Wikisource
 Colchester: a Hanseatic port – Gresham
 The Lost Port of Sutton: Maritime trade

 
Northern Europe
Former monopolies
Trade monopolies
Early Modern Holy Roman Empire
Former confederations
Early Modern history of Germany
Early Modern Netherlands
Economy of the Holy Roman Empire
Economic history of the Netherlands
History of international trade
Hanseatic League
International trade organizations
Baltic Sea
Brandenburg-Prussia
Gotland
Guilds
Northern Renaissance
History of Prussia
1862 disestablishments in Europe
14th century in Europe
15th century in Europe
16th century in Europe
Medieval Germany